The river Iset in Russia flows from the Urals through the Sverdlovsk and Kurgan Oblasts, then through Tyumen Oblast in Western Siberia into the river Tobol.  The city of Yekaterinburg is on the upper part of the river.

The Techa and the Miass are tributaries of the Iset.

References

Rivers of Sverdlovsk Oblast